Tennis was contested at the 2017 Summer Universiade from August 21 to 29 at the Taipei Tennis Center in Taipei, Taiwan.

Participating nations
A total of 186 athletes from 42 nations competed in tennis at the 2017 Summer Universiade:

Medal summary

Medal table

Events

See also
 Tennis at the Summer Universiade

References

External links
2017 Summer Universiade – Tennis
Result book – Tennis

 
2017
2017 Summer Universiade events
Universiade
2017